Platicrista is a genus of water bear or moss piglet, a tardigrade in the class Eutardigrada.

Species
 Platicrista affine (Mihelcic, 1951)
 Platicrista angustata (Murray, 1905)
 Platicrista cheleusis Kathman 1990
 Platicrista horribilis Kaczmarek and Michalczyk, 2003
 Platicrista itaquasconoide (Durante and Maucci, 1975)
 Platicrista ramsayi Marley, 2006

References

External links

Parachaela
Tardigrade genera
Polyextremophiles